4450 Pan is a highly eccentric asteroid and contact binary, classified as a potentially hazardous asteroid and near-Earth object of the Apollo group, approximately 1.1 kilometers in diameter. It was discovered on 25 September 1987, by American astronomers Eugene and Carolyn Shoemaker at Palomar Observatory in California, United States. It was named after Pan from Greek mythology.

Naming 

This minor planet was named after Pan, the Greek god of nature, shepherds of flocks and wild animals. In art, he was represented as a horned half-man, half goat. Pan was worshiped by the citizens of Athens, after he had inspired panic in the hearts of their Persians enemies in the Battle of Marathon (also see 4356 Marathon). The modern word "panic" origins from this myth. The name Pan has also been given to Saturn XVIII, one of the moons of Saturn. The official naming citation was published by the Minor Planet Center on 30 January 1991.

Orbit and classification 

Pan orbits the Sun in the inner main-belt at a distance of 0.6–2.3 AU once every 1 years and 9 months (633 days). Its orbit has an eccentricity of 0.59 and an inclination of 6° with respect to the ecliptic.

Due to its extremely eccentric orbit, it is also a Venus- and Mars-crosser and approaches Mercury within 20 Gm.

The body's observation arc begins at Palomar with its official discovery observation.

Physical characteristics 

Pan is an assumed stony S-type asteroid.

Contact binary 

Pan is a contact binary, composed of two lobes in mutual contact, held together only by their weak gravitational attraction, and typically show a dumbbell-like shape (also see 4769 Castalia). A large number of near-Earth objects are thought to be contact binaries.

Diameter and albedo 

The Collaborative Asteroid Lightcurve Link assumes a standard albedo for stony asteroids of 0.20 and calculates a diameter of 1.1 kilometers, while photometric observations by Italian Albino Carbognani at Saint-Barthelemy Observatory gave a diameter of  kilometers.

Rotation period 

In September 2013, a rotational lightcurve of Pan was obtained from photometric observations by American astronomer Brian Warner at his Palmer Divide Station in Colorado. It gave a long rotation period of  hours with a brightness variation of 0.64 in magnitude.

Notes

References

External links 
 Asteroid Lightcurve Database (LCDB), query form (info )
 Dictionary of Minor Planet Names, Google books
 Asteroids and comets rotation curves, CdR – Observatoire de Genève, Raoul Behrend
 
 
 

004450
004450
Discoveries by Eugene Merle Shoemaker
Discoveries by Carolyn S. Shoemaker
Named minor planets
004450
19870925